Gemini, also known as Big Geminii, is a rapper and recording artist, born in Dallas, Texas. After the song "Hypnotized" was released, he began to earn international fame. A remix of the song was released in 2008 featuring Flo Rida and Lil' Rob. In past times, Gemini has worked with artists such as NB Ridaz, MC Magic, and Frankie J. He made an album in a supergroup (with Playa Rae and Fade Dogg), entitled Texikali.

Discography

Albums

Features

Singles

With Gamebreakerz

References

Living people
Year of birth missing (living people)
Rappers from Houston
American rappers of Mexican descent
21st-century American rappers
Hispanic and Latino American rappers